Mark Soo Chang is a first-generation Korean-American and a Democratic member of the Maryland House of Delegates, currently representing District 32. The district is located within Anne Arundel County.

Early life and career
Chang was born on July 9, 1976 in Glen Burnie, Maryland. His mother died when he was eleven years old. He attended Glen Burnie High School and later the University of Maryland, Baltimore County, where he earned a B.A. degree in psychology and graduated cum laude in 1999. In 2010, he attended Loyola University Maryland, where he earned a M.B.A. degree.

Chang entered politics in 2003 by becoming a member of the Anne Arundel County Republican Central Committee. In 2006, he ran for Maryland House of Delegates as a Republican, winning the primary with 30.4 percent of the vote. He was defeated in the general election, only receiving 17.1 percent of the vote. After the 2006 race, Chang went to work as a community liaison for former Anne Arundel County executive John R. Leopold. In 2012, Chang switched his party affiliation from Republican to Democrat. After Leopold was convicted of abusing his office and resigned in February 2013, county executive Laura Neuman replaced Chang in March. Afterwards, Chang worked as a legislative aide to state senator James E. DeGrange, Sr.

On February 24, 2014, Chang filed to run for state delegate in District 32 as a Democrat, seeking to succeed Mary Ann Love. He won 21.8 percent of the vote in the primary election, and won the general election on November 4, 2014 with 18.6 percent of the vote, becoming the first Korean-American elected to the Maryland House of Delegates alongside state delegate David Moon.

In the legislature
Chang was sworn into the House of Delegates on January 14, 2015.

In March 2019, Chang introduced a bill that would prohibit placement of items or symbols on property to intimidate specific groups of people. The bill would pass the Maryland House of Delegates by a vote of 136-2, but did not receive a vote in the state Senate. The bill was reintroduced and passed in the House of Delegates by a vote of 133-4 and in the state Senate by an unanimous vote. Governor Larry Hogan signed the bill into law, and it went into effect on October 1, 2020.

Committee assignments
 Appropriations Committee, 2021–present (member, 2015–present; chair, capital budget subcommittee, 2020, vice-chair, 2019, 2021–present; member, oversight committee on personnel, 2015–2018; oversight committee on pensions, 2019–present; vice-chair, public safety & administration subcommittee, 2019, member, 2015–2019; education & economic development subcommittee, 2020–present)
 Joint Audit and Evaluation Committee, 2019–present
 Rules and Executive Nominations Committee, 2021–present
 Study Group on Economic Stability, 2021–present
 State Park Investment Commission, 2021–present
 Joint Committee on Fair Practices and State Personnel Oversight, 2018
 Joint Audit Committee, 2019

Other memberships
 Chair, Capital Budget Subcommittee, Anne Arundel County Delegation, 2016–present (member, capital bond subcommittee, 2015; alcohol subcommittee, 2016–2017)
 2nd Vice-Chair, Maryland Legislative Asian-American and Pacific-Islander Caucus, 2019–present (member, 2015–present; chair, outreach committee, 2021–present)
 Maryland Military Installation Legislative Caucus, 2017–present

Electoral history

References

American politicians of Korean descent
Asian-American people in Maryland politics
Democratic Party members of the Maryland House of Delegates
Living people
Loyola University Maryland alumni
People from Glen Burnie, Maryland
University of Maryland, Baltimore County alumni
1976 births
21st-century American politicians